The Mac Eden is a Czech single-place paraglider that was designed by Peter Recek and is produced by Mac Para Technology of Rožnov pod Radhoštěm. It remains in production in 2016 as the Eden 6.

Design and development
The Eden was designed as an intermediate cross country glider.

The design has progressed through six generations of models, the Eden, Eden 2, 3, 4, 5 and 6, each improving on the last. The models are each named for their approximate wing area in square metres.

The manufacturer claims a glide ratio of over 10:1 for the Eden 6.

Operational history
Reviewer Ziad Bassil described the Eden 6 in a review, "the Eden 6 is a new breed of Mac Para gliders. There’s something different in the making. The glide angle is the best you can get. The climb rate is very good! The handling is pleasurable. The Eden 6 is fast!
For sure, it’s a small step over the Eden 5 in piloting but ok for an experienced B pilot looking inside the high B category!".

Jürgen Karthe reviewing the Eden 6 concluded, "The Eden 6 is a great wing, giving enormous pleasure. Its the "Bird of Paradise" in 6th generation. A switch from Eden 5 to 6 should differ only in the higher performance of the new sail. The new Mac Para Eden 6 has an overall balanced and manageable basic characteristic and provides a great, safe feeling in the flight (fly in peace). Even in turbulent conditions, the wing retains largely stoic and does not detract from the good feeling of flight.
The glide of the Eden 6 is at the top of the current B segment. The manufacturer claims a glide ratio of 10+. This seems to be no dreamy optimism, but is according to our experience, corresponding to the reality."

Variants

Eden 2
Eden 2 23
Extra small-sized model for very light pilots. The glider model is DHV 1-2 and AFNOR Standard certified.
Eden 2 25
Small-sized model for lighter pilots. The glider model is DHV 1-2 and AFNOR Standard certified.
Eden 2 28
Mid-sized model for medium-weight pilots. The glider model is DHV 1-2 and AFNOR Standard certified.
Eden 2 30
Large-sized model for heavier pilots. The glider model is DHV 1-2 and AFNOR Standard certified.
Eden 2 33
Extra large-sized model for much heavier pilots.

Eden 6
Eden 6 22
Extra small-sized model for very light pilots. The glider model is LTF/EN-B certified.
Eden 6 24
Small-sized model for lighter pilots. The glider model is LTF/EN-B certified.
Eden 6 26
Mid-sized model for medium-weight pilots. The glider model is LTF/EN-B certified.
Eden 6 28
Large-sized model for heavier pilots. The glider model is LTF/EN-B certified.
Eden 6 30
Extra large-sized model for much heavier pilots. The glider model is LTF/EN-B certified.
Eden 6 33
Very large-sized model for even heavier pilots.

Specifications (Eden 2 28)

References

External links

Eden
Paragliders